Elstow is a special service area within the Rural Municipality of Blucher No. 343 in Saskatchewan, Canada. It dissolved from village status on December 31, 2014. It was originally incorporated as a village on December 17, 1908.

Demographics

See also 
 List of communities in Saskatchewan

References 

Special service areas in Saskatchewan
Former villages in Saskatchewan
Populated places disestablished in 2014
Division No. 15, Saskatchewan